Porumbrei is a commune in Cimișlia District, Moldova.

Communes of Cimișlia District